The sailing competitions at the 1995 Pan American Games took place in Mar Del Plata, Argentina.

Men's events

Women's events

Open events

Medal table

References

 

Events at the 1995 Pan American Games
Sailing at the Pan American Games
Sailing competitions in Argentina